Rafael Solis (born January 2, 1958 in Río Piedras, Puerto Rico) is a former junior lightweight boxer from Puerto Rico. He was raised in the barrio of Camito. Rafael trained at the Caimito Gym, and also frequented the Bairoa Gym.

Solis is the brother of Enrique Solis, Santos Solis and former world bantamweight champion Julian Solís.

Solis had a successful boxing career, fighting in many Latin American countries, such as Venezuela, Dominican Republic and others.

On October 2, 1982 Solis won the Fecarbox (Central American Professional Boxing Federation) super featherweight title, knocking out Aquilino Asprilla in the 6th round. On November 18, 1983, he challenged Héctor Camacho for the WBC's world Jr. Lightweight title. In what was the second time two Puerto Rican fighters fought each other for a world title (the first time was Benitez vs. Santos in 1981), Solis lost to Camacho by knockout in round five at Roberto Clemente Coliseum.

Solis last boxed in 1995 and retired with a record of 30 wins (20 by knockout), 13 losses (11 by knockout), and 2 draws.

References

External links

Rafael Solis boxing record
The Miami News  - Sep 29, 1982 Google News Archive

1959 births
Living people
Sportspeople from San Juan, Puerto Rico
People from Río Piedras, Puerto Rico
Puerto Rican male boxers
Super-featherweight boxers